Torkildsen is a surname, a patronymic from the name Torkild. Notable people with the surname include:

Arne Torkildsen (1899–1968), Norwegian neurosurgeon
Even Torkildsen Lande (1758–1833), Norwegian farmer and politician
Justin Torkildsen (born 1981), American actor
Peter G. Torkildsen, the former Massachusetts Republican State Committee Chairman
Thore Torkildsen Foss (1841–1913), Norwegian politician for the Liberal Party
Tor Torkildsen (1932–2006), Norwegian novelist and seaman
Torleif Torkildsen (1892–1944), Norwegian gymnast who competed in the 1912 Summer Olympics
Elijah K. Torkildsen (1956 - 2015) American New York lawyer, public relations, and lobbyist 

Norwegian-language surnames